The Wesleyan Argus is the student newspaper of Wesleyan University in Middletown, Connecticut, United States. Established in 1868, The Argus is the nation’s longest-running twice-weekly college newspaper, and is published every Tuesday and Friday throughout the school year. Each issue of The Argus includes the news, features, arts and culture, and sports sections, while Friday issues also include opinion articles.

History
The Argus was founded in 1868 and has been published bi-weekly since. The Argus does not run in exam periods and has paused publication during wartimes and the COVID-19 pandemic.

The Argus is named after Argus Panoptes, a many-eyed giant in Greek mythology.

In 1975, The Argus ran its first advertisement for a campus queer group.

In 2015, The Argus made headlines after a student wrote an opinion piece question the tactics of members of the Black Lives Matter movement. In response to student outrage, the President of the Wesleyan Student Assembly called for The Argus to be defunded. However, school leaders defended the right of students to freely write in The Argus and funding was never cut.

Notable alumni
 David Brancaccio, host of the public radio business program Marketplace Morning Report 
 Ethan Bronner, senior editor at Bloomberg News
 Miram Gottfired, reporter for The Wall Street Journal
 Jake Lahut, campaign reporter for The Daily Beast
 Alan Miller, Pulitzer Prize-winning journalist 
 Randall Pinkston, reporter for Al Jazeera America
 Hillary Rosner, freelance journalist
 Stephen Talbot, documentary producer for Frontline
 John Yang, special correspondent for the PBS NewsHour

References

Wesleyan University
Student newspapers published in Connecticut